Ochromolopis zagulajevi is a moth of the family Epermeniidae. It is found in the central part of Povolzh’je, northern Ukraine, the Crimea, the Caucasus Mountains, Transcaucasia and western Kazakhstan.

References

Moths described in 1991
Epermeniidae
Moths of Europe
Moths of Asia